Owch Bolagh (also Romanized as Owch Bolāgh and Ūchbolāgh; also known as Uchbulak) is a village in Qeshlaq-e Jonubi Rural District, Qeshlaq Dasht District, Bileh Savar County, Ardabil Province, Iran. At the 2006 census, its population was 50, in 12 families.

References 

Towns and villages in Bileh Savar County